Adam Chrzanowski (born 31 March 1999) is a Polish professional footballer who plays as a left-back for Ekstraklasa side Wisła Płock.

Club career
On 13 March 2020, Chrzanowski signed a contract with Italian Serie B club Pordenone, which became active in July 2020.

On 17 January 2022, he returned to Poland and moved to Wisła Płock on loan until the end of the season. On 30 June, he joined the club on a permanent basis, signing a three-year contract.

Honours
Lechia Gdańsk
 Polish Cup: 2018–19

References

External links

1999 births
Footballers from Warsaw
Living people
Polish footballers
Poland youth international footballers
Association football defenders
Znicz Pruszków players
Lechia Gdańsk players
Lechia Gdańsk II players
Wigry Suwałki players
Miedź Legnica players
Pordenone Calcio players
Wisła Płock players
Ekstraklasa players
I liga players
II liga players
III liga players
Serie B players
Polish expatriate footballers
Expatriate footballers in Italy
Polish expatriate sportspeople in Italy